Diary is a Maldivian romantic drama television mini-series developed for Television Maldives by Ahmed Shah. The series stars Mariyam Zuhura, Lufshan Shakeeb, Ali Firaq and Aminath Shareef in pivotal roles.

Premise
Rishna moves to Male' for higher studies and stays with Maleeha (Aminath Shareef) and her son Mazin (Lufshan Shakeeb). One night, Mazin's uncle, Majeed (Ali Firaq), attempts to sexually abuse Rishna while Mazin successfully stops him though injuring himself in the process. Several medical tests suggest that Mazin has a blood clot in the brain and needs immediate medical attention. Maleeha plans to arrange Rishna and Mazin's marriage much to Majeed's disappointment.

Cast
 Mariyam Zuhura as Rishna
 Lufshan Shakeeb as Mazin
 Aminath Shareef as Maleeha
 Ali Firaq as Majeed
 Hawwa Riyasha
 Ahmed Saeed as Azim
 Rashad Mohamed
 Mohamed Shiyam

Soundtrack

References

Serial drama television series
Maldivian television shows